Lieutenant-Colonel Sir Harry Calvert Williams Verney, 4th Baronet, DSO (7 June 1881 – 23 December 1974), was a British Liberal politician.

Political career
Verney stood as Liberal candidate for Basingstoke at the 1906 General Election. Shortly after, he was again Liberal candidate at the 1906 Basingstoke by-election. In the December general election he was elected to Parliament for Buckingham, a seat he held until 1918. He served under H. H. Asquith as Parliamentary Secretary to the Board of Agriculture and Fisheries from 1914 to 1915. He stood as Liberal candidate for Skipton at the 1922 and 1923 General Elections.

Verney succeeded in the baronetcy in May 1910. He was awarded the DSO in 1918.

Verney married Rachel Gwenyfyr Catherine, daughter of Victor Bruce, 9th Earl of Elgin, in 1911. His son Stephen Edmund Verney was Bishop of Repton from 1977 to 1985.

Verney was twice convicted for indecent assaults on boys under the age of sixteen, in 1937 and 1954.

Verney was the last surviving Liberal candidate from the 1906 General election. He died in December 1974, aged 93, and was succeeded to the baronetcy by his son, Ralph.

References

Further reading
Kidd, Charles, Williamson, David (editors). Debrett's Peerage and Baronetage (1990 edition). New York: St Martin's Press, 1990,

External links 
 
 

1881 births
1974 deaths
Baronets in the Baronetage of the United Kingdom
British Army personnel of World War I
Members of the Parliament of the United Kingdom for English constituencies
UK MPs 1910–1918
Harry
Companions of the Distinguished Service Order
Royal Army Service Corps officers
Liberal Party (UK) MPs for English constituencies
British politicians convicted of crimes
English people convicted of child sexual abuse
English people convicted of indecent assault
Violence against men in the United Kingdom